Scheffers is a Dutch surname. Notable people with this surname include:

Georg Scheffers (1899–1945), German mathematician
Maikel Scheffers (born 1982), Dutch wheelchair tennis player
Victor Scheffers (born 1960), Dutch rower

See also 
 Schaefer
 Scheffer

Dutch-language surnames